Lucy Brown (born 13 February 1979) is an English actress best known for dual roles in the TV series Primeval.

Biography

Early life
Lucy Brown was born in Crawley, Sussex, but grew up in Cambridgeshire. She is the daughter of Christopher Brown and Helen Burleigh and has a younger brother named Mark. She went to King's College Prep School in Cambridge and then on to Oundle School in Northamptonshire which she left to attend Hills Road Sixth Form College in Cambridge. She then went on to graduate from the Guildhall School of Music and Drama London. In December 2007, she was declared "Most Beautiful English Actress of the Year" by a panel of 104 actors.

Acting career
Her first job was in a commercial for the soap brand Lux where she appeared with Gisele Bündchen. She has appeared in Sharpe's Challenge, Malice Aforethought, North and South with Richard Armitage, Whatever Love Means, and in the dual roles of Claudia Brown and Jenny Lewis in the ITV1 science-fiction television series Primeval (2007–11).  After leaving Primeval, she played a minor role in NBC's The Philanthropist. In 2010, she appeared in Bonded By Blood and  Frost opposite Dean Cain. Brown returned to Primeval for Series 4 (as Jenny Lewis).

Brown also frequently takes part in live events billed as Word Theatre. She has performed for them in Los Angeles and London. She also reads for audio books.

In 2012, she said revealed that she and Olivia Poulet were currently writing a comedy drama. In 2014, she appeared in the television drama The Village, cast as Harriet Kilmartin.

Personal life
Brown lives in London. She married actor Adam Rayner on 31 December 2015. They have a son and daughter together.

Filmography

References

External links

Lucy Brown – The Placeholder Page

1979 births
Living people
English television actresses
English film actresses
People from Crawley
People educated at Oundle School
21st-century English actresses